Cryptophorellia trivittata is a species of tephritid or fruit flies in the genus Cryptophorellia of the family Tephritidae.

Distribution
Kenya, Zambia, Malawi.

References

Tephritinae
Insects described in 1989
Diptera of Africa